Glenhazel is a suburb of the Municipality of Johannesburg, South Africa. 
It is located in Region E, bordering Fairmount, Sandringham, Lyndhurst and Percelia Estate. The area lies on a sloping hill with a park in the valley.

History
The suburb is situated on part of an old Witwatersrand farm called Rietfontein and was established in 1950.

Communities
Glenhazel is well known for being a suburb with a high ethnic concentration of Jewish people. A large number of synagogues, schools and Jewish seminaries are based in and around the Glenhazel area. Yeshiva College of South Africa is found in the suburb. Also to be found is the Glenhazel primary school, and the nearby Lyndhurst primary school.

References

Johannesburg Region E
Jews and Judaism in Johannesburg
Orthodox Jewish communities
Orthodox Judaism in South Africa